The Boros Collection is a private collection of contemporary art by Karen and Christian Boros, which has been on display since 2008 in a World War II era bunker (called the Reichsbahnbunker) in Berlin, Germany. The collection comprises artworks in the mediums of sculpture, photography and painting by international contemporary artists. The works are installed on five floors of the bunker, which the architect Jens Casper transformed into a compendium of individual rooms that interconnect on multiple floors. While some rooms were transformed into classic white cube spaces, others still bare traces of the bunker's lineage when it was used as a prison, storage facility and techno club. Each exhibition in the bunker additionally includes site-specific works that refer to and interact with the various interior spaces and their history.

The collection is accessible to the public from Thursdays through Sundays only in the form of guided tours via prior application on the website of the collection.

The current collection, “Boros Collection / Bunker Berlin #3” opened in May 2017 and presents recently acquired works as well as pieces from the 1990s and 2000s.

Boros Collection/ Bunker Berlin #1 (2008–2012) 

 Michael Beutler 
 John Bock 
 Olafur Eliasson 
 Elmgreen und Dragset 
 Kitty Kraus 
 Robert Kusmirowski 
 Mark Leckey 
 Manuela Leinhoß 
 Sarah Lucas 
 Kris Martin 
 Henrik Olesen 
 Manfred Pernice 
 Daniel Pflumm 
 Tobias Rehberger 
 Anselm Reyle 
 Bojan Sarcevic 
 Santiago Sierra 
 Florian Slotawa 
 Monika Sosnowska 
 Katja Strunz 
 Rirkrit Tiravanija

The first exhibition was visited by over 120,000 guests.

Boros Collection/ Bunker Berlin #2 (2012–2016) 

 Ai Weiwei 
 Awst & Walther 
 Dirk Bell
 Cosima von Bonin 
 Marieta Chirulescu 
 Thea Djordjadze 
 Olafur Eliasson 
 Alicja Kwade 
 Klara Lidén 
 Florian Meisenberg 
 Roman Ondák 
 Mandla Reuter
 Stephen G. Rhodes 
 Thomas Ruff 
 Michael Sailstorfer 
 Tomás Saraceno 
 Thomas Scheibitz 
 Wolfgang Tillmans 
 Rirkrit Tiravanija 
 Danh Võ 
 Cerith Wyn Evans 
 Thomas Zipp

The second exhibition was visited by over 200,000 guests.

Boros Collection/ Bunker Berlin #3 (2017) 

 Martin Boyce
 Andreas Eriksson 
 Guan Xiao 
 He Xiangyu 
 Uwe Henneken 
 Yngve Holen 
 Sergej Jensen 
 Daniel Josefsohn 
 Friedrich Kunath 
 Michel Majerus 
 Fabian Marti 
 Kris Martin 
 Justin Matherly 
 Paulo Nazareth 
 Katja Novitskova 
 Peter Piller 
 Pamela Rosenkranz 
 Avery Singer 
 Johannes Wohnseifer

References 

Art collections in Germany
Contemporary art galleries in Germany
Art museums and galleries in Berlin
2008 establishments in Germany
Art galleries established in 2008